Lefteris "Terry" Antonis (born 26 November 1993) is an Australian association football player who plays for the Western Sydney Wanderers as a midfielder.

Born in Sydney, Antonis played youth football at the Australian Institute of Sport before making his professional debut for Sydney FC at sixteen years of age.

Antonis has played for Australia on three occasions and was a member of the squad which won the 2015 AFC Asian Cup. He previously represented Australia frequently at youth level, including at the 2011 FIFA U-20 World Cup.

A versatile player, Antonis can play as a box-to-box, holding or attacking midfielder, though he is best deployed in deeper roles, where he can create play with his extensive passing range.

Early life
Antonis was born in the suburb of Bankstown, Sydney, and is of Greek descent.

He first received media attention in Australia at the age of 10 by winning a football talent competition on the Channel 7 television show Today Tonight, which resulted in a trip to Madrid to make a training skills DVD with David Beckham. Frank Farina, former Socceroos coach and judge of the Channel 7 competition said: "His juggling is very good, he pulled out a squash ball and started juggling that and didn't drop it once, he is very impressive." He also obtained a sponsorship from Adidas because of his exceptional juggling skills.

Former Australian international Alex Tobin described him as "one of the most outstanding young players that I have seen" and "of immense talent without a doubt." He has also been touted as natural successor to Tim Cahill and Brett Holman in the Australian national team.

Antonis holds both an Australian and Greek passport.

Early career
Antonis began his football career at St Christopher's Soccer Club in Bankstown before moving to Sydney Olympic and Marconi.

Antonis signed a five-year contract with Everton at just 14 years of age, but his contract was terminated due to FIFA's rule prohibiting the overseas transfers of players under the age of 18.

Club career

Sydney FC

On 22 June 2010, he made his debut for Sydney in a friendly game against Macarthur Rams at Campbelltown Stadium. 
Then on 5 July 2010, Sydney signed him to a 3-year contract .
Antonis made his competitive debut for Sydney FC in a 2–1 loss to Wellington Phoenix on 11 September 2010. Antonis scored his first goal for Sydney FC on 16 February 2013 against Adelaide United.

After rupturing a muscle in his thigh, Antonis was out for 9 months, which thwarted his move overseas. In February 2014, he scored against Perth Glory in his first game since returning from injury.

Speculation and trials

After signing with Sydney FC, he was linked with possible moves to Everton, Inter Milan and Marseille. Much of the speculation was based on his close personal ties with Everton and Socceroo star Tim Cahill, further sparked by a 25-minute cameo in a friendly match for Sydney FC against Everton at ANZ Stadium on 10 July 2010. In February 2012, Antonis reiterated his commitment to Sydney FC and the remainder of his three-year contract, stating that he was more than happy being at the club.

In April 2012, Antonis travelled to Germany to trial with Bundesliga club Borussia Mönchengladbach as a potential replacement for Roman Neustadter. but was not signed.

At the conclusion of the 2012–13 season, Antonis was approached by Dutch club FC Utrecht for a trial, but signed a four-year deal with Italian Serie A club Parma instead after Parma triggered a release clause in his contract with Sydney. However, the deal never went through and Antonis returned to Sydney FC.

PAOK

The 21-year-old returned to Sydney from preseason camp on the Gold Coast with News Corp reporting a $500,000 bid for the midfielder from PAOK FC.

Greek sources stated that Antonis spoke at length with former Danish international and Technical Director of PAOK Frank Arnesen on the prospects of completing the move to his ancestral country and the planning of PAOK's title aspirations that season.

Terry Antonis made his debut for PAOK in the Greek Cup match away to Chania on 3 December 2015, coming on as a 64th-minute substitute for Eyal Golasa. He made his Greek Super League debut on 21 February 2016 away to Panathinaikos as an 84th-minute replacement for Giannis Mystakidis.

Loan to Veria
After failing to break into the starting team at PAOK, Antonis moved to Greek Super League outfit Veria FC, coached by Georgios Georgiadis, a former PAOK favourite as a player.
Antonis signed a one-year loan deal with Veria on 31 August 2016. He made his first appearance on 16 October 2016 as an 88th-minute substitute for Sisinio González Martínez in an away match at Atromitos.

Loan to Western Sydney Wanderers
As at PAOK, he struggled to break into a starting position, and was returned to Paok only to be immediately loaned to Western Sydney Wanderers FC for the remainder of the 2016–17 A-League season.
He made his debut for the Wanderers in an away match against the Brisbane Roar on 28 January 2017 as a 77th minute substitute for Mitch Nichols.

VVV-Venlo
After his short-lived loan spell with the Wanderers, PAOK made it clear to Antonis that he wasn't in their plans. On 8 July 2017, it was announced that Antonis had signed with Dutch Eredivisie side VVV-Venlo on a two-year deal.

Melbourne Victory
Released by VVV-Venlo on 3 January 2018 without having made a single league appearance for the club, Antonis then signed a 2.5-year contract with Melbourne Victory of the A-League where he made 40 appearances before moving on yet again, to Suwon Samsung Bluewings of the K-League.

Return to Western Sydney Wanderers
On 25 July 2021, Antonis signed a three-year deal with the Western Sydney Wanderers. His first season he often alternated between starting and coming off the bench. Following the replacement of coach Carl Robinson with Marko Rudan, Antonis was frozen out by club leadership in an effort to force him to agree to leave the club which would free up salary cap room & his squad position.

International career

Antonis was part of the final squad for the 2015 AFC Asian Cup but he did not get any actual game time during the tournament.
On 23 December 2015, Antonis was included to Australia U-23 national team manager's Aurelio Vidmar selections for Olympic Games 2016 qualifiers, which took place in Doha.

Career statistics

Honours

Club
Melbourne Victory
 A-League Championship: 2017–18

Suwon Samsung Bluewings
 Korean FA Cup: 2019

Country
Australia
 AFC Asian Cup: 2015

References

External links
 
 
 
 	

1993 births
Australian people of Greek descent
Australia international soccer players
Australia youth international soccer players
Australia under-20 international soccer players
Association football midfielders
A-League Men players
Sydney FC players
PAOK FC players
Veria F.C. players
Western Sydney Wanderers FC players
VVV-Venlo players
Melbourne Victory FC players
Suwon Samsung Bluewings players
2015 AFC Asian Cup players
Australian Institute of Sport soccer players
Sportsmen from New South Wales
Living people
AFC Asian Cup-winning players
Soccer players from Sydney
Australian soccer players
Naturalized citizens of Greece